Upington Airport  is an airport located in Upington, Northern Cape, South Africa. At , runway 17/35 is one of the longest runways in the world. The high elevation of the airport, extremely high summer temperatures and the fact that it was designed for the Boeing 747 necessitated the extreme length of the main runway.

History

With the fall of the Portuguese regime in Angola, South African Airways lost its landing rights in Luanda. In addition to restrictions to overflying African states, there was concern that the country would lose its landing rights at the Ivory Coast and Ilha do Sal (Cape Verde).

Upington Airport's runway was built to accommodate a Boeing 747 with a full load of passengers, cargo and fuel, so that it could take off for Europe without having to stop along the way. Upington was chosen because of its strategic position, availability of land and comparatively lower height above sea level than Johannesburg.

Upington Airport was opened in 1968 as Pierre van Ryneveld Airport. In 1974, a corrugated iron fire station was erected but this structure was converted into administrative offices for airport management and other administrative staff in 1996 and the fire station was relocated.

From August 1976 to December 1982, South African Airways made use of Upington as a refuelling station for two weekly scheduled Boeing 747 flights to London and Zürich.

, Upington Airport was to be developed into a major cargo hub that will serve sub-Saharan Africa directly from South Africa's Northern Cape Province.

As well as improvements to the airport itself, ACSA will be preparing land around the airport for development to support the inevitable boost to the local economy.

As of 2009, planning was also under way at Upington Airport to construct a facility for the long-term parking of mothballed (decommissioned) aircraft.

Airlines and destinations

Non-scheduled services
Upington Airport serves as an international cargo hub. Most flights are non-scheduled chartered flights operating in the months of November to January to export grapes from the region directly to Europe and other countries. As much as 1,000,000 tonnes of grapes are exported every year.

Many major car manufacturers bring their cars and commercial vehicles to Upington to test them in the hot dry and sunny conditions, when there is winter in Europe. These cars and test teams are flown into and out of Upington Airport using chartered planes. Cars used the N14 between Pofadder and Kakamas.

Airport services and capacity
Services at Upington Airport include:
 One terminal building (combined arrival and departure hall)
 Information desk
 Conference room accommodating up to 12 persons
 Five different car rental companies
 Public parking for up to 58 cars
 Basic first aid facilities

Statistics for the 2007 financial year at Upington Airport:
 19,961 departing passengers
 3,694 arriving air traffic movements
 Current consolidated capacity: 40,000 passengers
 Aircraft parking bays: 20

Flying services include:
 Control tower (frequency 121.30)
 Apron services (frequency 122.65)
 Refuelling service by Engen Aviation providing Avgas and Jet-A1
 General aviation area including parking
 VOR and RNAV instrument approach procedure for runway 35
 Runway centreline lights, end lights, edge lights and PAPI for runways 01/19 and 17/35
 Runway 08/26 only to be used for taxi purposes at night and during IMC
 Fire and rescue services (CAT 5), upgrade-able to CAT 8 with 7 days prior notice 
 Upington Weather Office
The airport has cargo services to and from Leipzig with AirBridge Cargo(Boeing 747-8F)

Statistics

See also
 List of airports in South Africa
 List of South African airports by passenger movements
 Airports Company South Africa

References

External links
 Official aerodrome chart for FAUP – SACAA Website
Upington Airport Homepage – ACSA Website
 South African Airlink Homepage
 Walker Flying Services

Airports in South Africa
Transport in the Northern Cape
Dawid Kruiper Local Municipality